Immunity is the debut studio album by American singer-songwriter Clairo, released on August 2, 2019, by Fader Label. The album was co-produced by Clairo and Rostam Batmanglij, formerly of Vampire Weekend.

Background
After the release of her first mainstream extended play, Diary 001, Clairo released several songs and collaborations. In 2018, she wrote a song for the teen drama film Skate Kitchen, called "Heaven". She also collaborated with Cuco and SG Lewis. On February 1, 2019, Clairo was featured on the lead single for Wallows' debut studio album, Nothing Happens. On May 24, 2019, Clairo released the lead single for her album, "Bags", and announced the album release for August.

Composition
It has been described as a soft rock, bedroom pop, electropop, and indie pop record.

Tour 
In September 2019, Clairo embarked on a North American tour playing 31 shows at venues such as Metro Chicago and Paradise Rock Club. The tour was supported by Beabadoobee and Hello Yello and ended in Boston in November 2019.

Critical reception 

Immunity received positive reviews from music critics. At Metacritic, which assigns a normalized rating out of 100 to reviews from mainstream publications, the album received an average score of 76, based on 20 reviews.

Accolades 
At the end of 2019, Immunity appeared on a number of critics' lists ranking the year's top albums.

Track listing

Notes
  signifies an additional producer.

Personnel

Musicians
 Claire Cottrill – lead vocals , electric guitar , acoustic guitar , drum programming , piano , drum arrangement , guitar solo , synth 
 Rostam Batmanglij – synth , bass , piano , drum programming , electric guitar , acoustic guitar , harpsichord , synth bass , Mellotron , 808 bass , drum arrangement , organ , synth programming , bass programming 
 Danielle Haim – drums , drum arrangement 
 Peter Cottontale – Wurlitzer , keyboard , drum programming , piano , choir arrangement 
 Nick Breton – drum arrangement 

The Adderly School Choir
 Janet Adderley – leading
 Ruby Nieman
 Olivia Bingham
 Hudson Marks
 Christopher van der Ohe
 Deia Campodonico
 Siena Fantini
 Hiro Phillips

Technical
 Rostam Batmanglij – recording engineering , mixing 
 Dalton Ricks – recording engineering 
 Cary Singer – recording engineering 
 Michael Harris – recording engineering 
 Nick Breton – recording engineering 
 Nate Head – recording engineering 
 Tom Elmhirst – mixing 
 Shawn Everett– mixing 
 Manny Marroquin – mixing 
 Dave Fridmann – mixing 
 Mike Fridmann – mix engineering 
 Emily Lazar – mastering
 Chris Allgood – mastering assistance

Artwork
 Hart Lëshkina - front and back cover photography
 Bijan Berahimi – graphic design
 Jimmy Bui – interior photography
 Mike Ahern – interior photography
 Brodie McCuskey – interior photography
 Angela Ricciardi – interior photography
 Nolan Feldpausch – interior photography
 Allie Cottrill – interior photography
 Cailin Hill Araki – interior photography
 Blake Wasson – interior photography

Charts

References

External links

2019 debut albums
Clairo albums
Fader Label albums
Albums produced by Rostam Batmanglij